Robert Jay Mathews (January 16, 1953 – December 8, 1984) was an American neo-Nazi activist and the leader of The Order, an American white supremacist militant group. He was killed during a shootout with approximately 75 federal law enforcement agents who surrounded his house on Whidbey Island, near Freeland, Washington.

Mathews' life inspired the 1999 television film Brotherhood of Murder.

Life and activities

Early years 
Robert Mathews was born in Marfa, Texas on January 16, 1953, the youngest of three sons born to Johnny and Una Mathews. His father, of Scottish descent, was mayor of the town, and the President of the Chamber of Commerce, as well as a businessman and leader for the local Methodist church. His mother was the town's Cub Scout den mother.

The family moved to Phoenix, Arizona. Though he was an average student in grade school, history and politics interested him. At age 11, he joined the John Birch Society, a right-wing advocacy group supporting paleoconservatism, anti-communism and limited government. Mathews was baptized into the Church of Jesus Christ of Latter-day Saints in 1969.

Mathews formed the Sons of Liberty, an anti-communist militia whose members were mainly Mormon survivalists. At its peak, it had approximately 30 members. After filling out his employer's W-4 Form claiming ten dependents, reportedly as an act of tax resistance, he was arrested for tax fraud, tried, and placed on probation for six months. After a falling out between the Mormon and non-Mormon members of the Sons of Liberty, the organization stagnated and Mathews withdrew from it.

After his probation ended in 1974, he moved to Metaline Falls, Washington, where Mathews and his father purchased 60 wooded acres for their home.

Mathews and Debbie McGarity were married in 1976. He raised Scottish Galloway cattle. He and Debbie McGarity adopted a son in 1981. Mathews later had a biological daughter with his mistress, Zillah Craig.

The Order 

Mathews became a white supremacist and in 1982 he made an effort to recruit white families to the Pacific Northwest, or the White American Bastion.

In 1983, Mathews delivered a speech at a National Alliance convention reporting on his efforts to recruit on behalf of the organization, especially among "the yeoman farmers and independent truckers," to his White American Bastion group. Mathews was a fan of the far-right extremist 1978 novel The Turner Diaries written by National Alliance founder William Luther Pierce.

In late September 1983, at a barracks he constructed on his property in Metaline, Mathews and eight other men founded the organization The Order. They included his friend and neighbor, Ken Loff, and others from the Aryan Nations: Dan Bauer, Randy Duey, Denver Parmenter, Bruce Pierce, and David Lane; and the National Alliance: Richie Kemp and Bill Soderquist.

The group's first task, according to Mathews' plan, was to obtain money to support white separatism. Their activities began to parallel events in the novel The Turner Diaries. They robbed an adult bookstore in Spokane, Washington, which netted them $369.10. They agreed that was too risky, and turned to robbing armored cars and counterfeiting. They printed some counterfeit $50 bills, and 28-year-old Pierce was arrested after passing off a few of them.

To raise Pierce's bail, Mathews, acting alone, robbed a bank just north of Seattle, Washington, stealing around $26,000. Some of The Order's members, along with a new recruit, Gary Yarborough, carried out more robberies and burglaries, which netted them over $43,000. A subsequent robbery yielded several hundred thousand dollars. Another recruit, Tom Martinez, was caught and charged for passing more counterfeit currency. Then in July 1984, they deployed approximately a dozen men in a successful effort to rob a Brink's truck of $3,600,000.

The group distributed some of the stolen money to the North Carolina-based White Patriot Party and other white nationalist organizations.

Final days 
Prior to his death, Mathews wrote a long letter declaring war on the federal government of the United States and justifying his group's actions.  In it, he describes threats allegedly made to members of his family by Federal Bureau of Investigation (FBI) agents, including to his young son while he was away from his house, as well as a number of attempts on his life by other government agents.  He explained the reasons for his decision to "quit being the hunted and become the hunter," and closed by writing, "I am not going into hiding, rather I will press the FBI and let them know what it is like to become the hunted. Doing so it is only logical to assume that my days on this planet are rapidly drawing to a close. Even so, I have no fear. For the reality of my life is death, and the worst the enemy can do to me is shorten my tour of duty in this world. I will leave knowing that I have made the ultimate sacrifice to ensure the future of my children."

After his counterfeiting arrest, Martinez eventually became an FBI informant.  He revealed information regarding Mathews' activities to the FBI, agents moved to capture Mathews and his associates, leading to one of the largest manhunts in FBI history. By the time they could set up the operation, all of Mathews' accomplices and friends had decided to move to safe houses. The government's agents surrounded Mathews in a house near Freeland, Washington on Whidbey Island on December 7, 1984.  Mathews refused to come out and negotiations continued until December 8, when Mathews refused to talk anymore. The FBI then fired dozens of smoke grenades and a stun grenade into the house in an attempt to force Mathews out, but were thwarted by his use of a gas mask. Mathews opened fire on several agents who attempted to enter the house, and a long standoff began. When a helicopter appeared at nightfall, Mathews opened fire on it from an upstairs window – the helicopter's crew was unhurt – and then once again exchanged gunfire with federal agents. An FBI agent then fired three M79 Starburst flares inside the house from the helicopter, setting off a box of hand grenades and a stockpile of ammunition. Mathews continued to fire an assault rifle at agents as the house burned, but then suddenly stopped. After the wreckage had cooled enough to be searched, agents found the burned remains of 31-year-old Mathews' body, with a pistol still in his hand. An autopsy concluded that Mathews had died from a combination of burns and smoke inhalation.  Mathews had fired over 1,000 rounds at law enforcement, but no agents were injured.

Mathews' remains were cremated and the ashes scattered by his family on his property in Metaline, Washington.

Eventually over 75 people were convicted of crimes connected to The Order in eight trials, on charges that included racketeering, conspiracy, counterfeiting, transporting stolen money, armored car robbery, and violation of civil rights. Later, ten people connected to the case, including Butler, Lane, and Pierce, were tried for sedition, but were acquitted by a jury.

See also 
 Zionist Occupation Government conspiracy theory

References 

1953 births
1984 deaths
20th-century American criminals
American bank robbers
American conspiracy theorists
American counterfeiters
American Latter Day Saints
American male criminals
American people convicted of tax crimes
American people of Scottish descent
American neo-Nazis
Arizona Independents
Christian Identity
Deaths by firearm in Washington (state)
Far-right terrorism
John Birch Society members
People from Island County, Washington
People from Marfa, Texas
People shot dead by law enforcement officers in the United States
Washington (state) Independents